North End is a name for a neighbourhood in the London Borough of Bexley and the term is of fading use. It was originally a hamlet or farmstead towards the north of the parish of Crayford, a parish founded by the early middle ages and which continues in the Church of England.

North End has largely been absorbed by the sprawl of neighbouring communities. It previously covered an area either side of what is now North End Road, between Colyers Lane and Boundary Street, and included Myrtle Farm. In 1848 Samuel Lewis's 'A Topographical Dictionary of England' states that Northend was a hamlet with 191 people.

Bus routes 89 and route 428 serve the area and Southeastern trains serve Slade Green railway station on the North Kent Line from Dartford to London.

As wards currently are named, in an approximately 10-year renaming and redrawing, a North End ward covers a wider area in the London Borough of Bexley.

References

Areas of London
Districts of the London Borough of Bexley